UCO Bank, formerly United Commercial Bank, is a central public sector bank under the ownership of Ministry of Finance, Government of India. It was established in 1943 in Kolkata. During FY 2020–21, its total business was  3.24 lakh crore. Based on 2020 data, it is ranked 80 on the Fortune India 500 list. UCO Bank was ranked 1948 in Forbes Global 2000 list of year 2018.   the bank had 4,000 plus service units 49 zonal offices spread all over India. It also has two overseas branches in Singapore and Hong Kong. UCO Bank's headquarters is on BTM Sarani, Kolkata.

History

G. D. Birla, an eminent Indian industrialist, during the Quit India movement of 1942, conceived the idea of organising a commercial bank with Indian capital and management, and the United Commercial Bank Limited was incorporated to give shape to that idea. The bank was started with Kolkata as its head office with an issued capital of 2 crores, of which 1 crore was actually paid-up. Birla was its chairman; the Board of Directors included eminent personalities of India drawn from many fields. The bank opened 14 branches simultaneously across India.

After World War II, United Commercial Bank opened several overseas branches. The first, in 1947, was in Rangoon. Branches in Singapore (1951), Hong Kong (March 1952), London (1953), and Malaysia followed. In 1963 the Burmese government nationalized United Commercial Bank's three branches there, which became People's Bank No. 6.

On 15 September 1967, Jalpaiguri Banking and Trading Corporation (JBTC) which had been established in Jalpaiguri in 1887 (or 1889; accounts differ), made a voluntary transfer of its assets and liabilities to United Commercial Bank. JBTC had only one office and specialised in lending against mortgages on tea gardens.

The Government of India nationalised United Commercial Bank on 19 July 1969. The nationalised bank continued the operations of the overseas branches in London, Singapore, and Hong Kong. However, Malaysian law forbade foreign government ownership of banks in Malaysia. Therefore, United Commercial, Indian Overseas Bank, and Indian Bank contributed their operations in Malaysia to a new joint-venture bank incorporated in Malaysia, United Asian Bank, with each of the three parent banks owning a third of the shares. At the time, Indian Bank had three branches, and Indian Overseas Bank and United Commercial Bank had eight between them.

An act of parliament changed the bank's name to UCO Bank in 1985, as a bank in Bangladesh existed with the name "United Commercial Bank", which caused confusion in the international banking arena.

In 1991, Bank of Commerce acquired United Asian Bank; in time CIMB came to own Bank of Commerce.

In 1998, UCO closed its London branch. Bank of Baroda acquired the assets and liabilities, but not the personnel, who were made redundant.

Current market position

As on 31 March 2021, government share-holding in the bank was 94.44%. For FY 2020-21, it registered ₹167 crore net profit. Branch expansion started at a fast pace, particularly in rural areas, and the bank achieved several unique distinctions in Priority Sector lending and other social uplift activities. To keep pace with the developing scenario and expansion of business, the Bank undertook an exercise in organisational restructuring in the year 1972. This resulted in more functional specialisation, decentralisation of administration and emphasis on development of personnel skill and attitude. Side by side, whole hearted commitment into the government's poverty alleviation programmes continued and the convenorship of State Level Bankers' Committee (SLBC) was entrusted on the Bank for Odisha and Himachal Pradesh in 1983.

Structure

Board of Directors
As of August 2021, the UCO Bank Board of Directors has six members:
 Shri Shri Soma Shankar prasad (MD & CEO)
 Shri Ajay Vyas (Executive Director)
 Shri  Ishraq Ali Khan (Executive Director)
 Dr. Sanjay Kumar (Director)
 Dr. (Smt) Tuli Roy (Director)
 Shri K. Rajivan Nair (Director)

Regional management

The governance of the Bank all around the nation's respective regional areas is managed by a network of 42 Zonal Offices present in major as well as crucial parts of the country.

Training

The training of newly recruited as well as present staff is overseen by seven training colleges around India:

Central Staff College, Kolkata
Regional Training Centre, Ahmedabad
Regional Training Centre, Bhubaneswar
Regional Training Centre, Bhopal
Regional Training Centre, Chandigarh
Regional Training Centre, Chennai
Regional Training Centre, Jaipur

Presence

The Bank's Regional presence includes 3,078 branches and 2,564 ATMs. The near Future will see a growth in the number of ATMs and Branches.

International presence

Besides providing inland banking services through its vast network of branches in India, UCO Bank has a vital presence in the financial markets outside India. UCO Bank presently has four overseas branches in two important international financial centres in Singapore and Hong Kong.

UCO Bank has international presence for over 60 years now.

The Bank's Singapore Operations commenced from 21 April 1951 with the opening of Singapore Main branch and subsequently Serangoon branch was opened in "Little India" on 7 March 1959. The international linkage from Singapore is supported by a large number of Indian branches network through Integrated Treasury Branch, Mumbai. Other branches in India also provide international banking facilities through Authorised Branches of the bank.

This international network is further augmented by correspondent arrangements with leading Banks at all important world centres in various countries.

Non-banking subsidiaries

The bank has requested the RBI for an approval for new Non-Banking entities under its command. The new entities would ensure a complete market foothold.

Logo and motto
 The logo of UCO bank consists of a pair of clasped hands covered with an octagonal structure. It has been coloured blue since the organisation's inception, blue representing the Bank's national responsibility. The background has remained yellow since the beginning as well.
The motto UCO Bank is "Honours your Trust".
 The UCO bank Logo has resemblance to logo of leading South African Life Insurance company Sanlam. Sanlam has tie up with Shriram Group in India who provide Insurance to passengers travelling in Indian Railways

Major market competition

UCO Bank's major competitors have always been State Bank of India, Punjab National Bank, Bank of Baroda, HDFC Bank, ICICI Bank, Axis Bank, and Bank of India. The earlier years saw a limited presence of rivals who were mostly public sector entities. In the recent years, the surge of private banks has broadened the spectrum. The liberalisation of the economy may bring foreign banks, which could intensify inter-bank competition for commercial and well-to-do retail customers.

See also

 Banking in India
 List of banks in India
 Reserve Bank of India
 Indian Financial System Code
 List of largest banks
 List of companies of India
 Make in India

Citations and references
Citations

References
 
 
  
Turnell, Sean (2009) Fiery Dragons: Banks, Moneylenders and Microfinance in Burma. (NAIS Press).

External links
Official website

Public Sector Banks in India
Banks established in 1943
Banks based in Kolkata
Indian companies established in 1943
Companies listed on the National Stock Exchange of India
Companies listed on the Bombay Stock Exchange